The 2021 Korean Tour was the 11th season of the Korean Tour to carry Official World Golf Ranking points. All the tournaments have prize funds of at least 500 million won (approximately US$500,000). Eight have prize funds of 1 billion won ($1,000,000) or more.

Schedule
The following table lists official events during the 2021 season.

Order of Merit
The Order of Merit was titled as the Genesis Points and was based on prize money won during the season, calculated using a points-based system.

Notes

References

External links

2021 Korean Tour
2021 in golf
2021 in South Korean sport